The 2011–12 Regional Four Day Competition was the 46th domestic first-class cricket tournament held in the West Indies, it took place from 5 February 201116 April 2012. Unlike the previous year when the touring England Lions took part in the series, this edition was played between the seven teams based in the Caribbean. The tournament retained the same structure as the previous season; a roundrobin that was followed by semifinals where the top four teams competed.

Jamaica won the tournament for the 12th time and for the fifth time in succession. It is the first time that a team has won five outright titles in a row, previously Barbados had won four in a row plus a shared title from 1975/76 to 1979/80. Jamaica sealed their victory by beating Barbados by 139 runs in the final at Sabina Park; this was preceded by a semifinal win over Guyana and six wins from six games in the initial league stage, which saw them finish top of the table.

Points table

Round-Robin

Semi finals

Final

Points allocation

Completed match

 Outright win12
 Loser if 1st Innings lead obtained4
 Loser if tie on 1st Innings3
 Loser if 1st Innings also lost0
 Tie8

Incomplete Match

 1st Innings lead6
 1st Innings loss3
 Tie on 1st innings4

Score Equal in a Drawn Match

 Team batting on the 4th innings8
 Team fielding on the 4th innings if that team has lead on 1st innings6
 If scores tied on 1st innings4
 If team has lost on 1st innings3

Abandoned Match

In the event of a match being abandoned without any play having taken place, or in the event of there being no 1st innings decision, three points each.

References

Regional Four Day Competition
2011–12 West Indian cricket season
Regional Four Day Competition seasons